Earthman's Burden is a collection of science fiction  stories by American writers Poul Anderson and Gordon R. Dickson.  It was first published by Gnome Press in 1957.  The story "Don Jones" was original to this collection.  The other stories originally appeared in the magazines Other Worlds, Universe and Fantasy and Science Fiction.

The stories involve a teddy bear-like alien race known as Hokas, and spoof a variety of fictional genres.

Contents

 "The Sheriff of Canyon Gulch"
 "Don Jones"
 "In Hoka Signo Vinces"
 "The Adventure of the Misplaced Hound"
 "Yo Ho Hoka!"
 "The Tiddlywink Warriors"

Reception
Floyd C. Gale wrote that the stories in Earthman's Burden were "reasonably amusing. Under one cover and in company with minor works, though, the cumulative effect is less rewarding ... Hoka, like pickles, is a tasty appetizer in moderation, but leaves a characteristic aftertaste if overindulged".

See also

The White Man's Burden

References

Sources

External links 
 

1957 short story collections
Short story collections by Poul Anderson
Short story collections by Gordon R. Dickson
Gnome Press books